This article is about the demographic features of the population of Romania, including population density, ethnicity, education level, health of the populace, economic status, religious affiliations, and other aspects of the population.

About 89.3% of the people of Romania are ethnic Romanians (as per the 2022 Romanian census), whose native language, Romanian, is a Daco-Romance language, descended from Latin (more specifically from Vulgar Latin) with some French, German, English, Greek, Italian, Slavic, and Hungarian borrowings.

Romanians are by far the most numerous group of speakers of an Eastern Romance language today. It has been said that they constitute "an island of Latinity" in Eastern Europe, surrounded on all sides either by Slavic peoples (namely Southern Slavic peoples and Eastern Slavic peoples) or by the Hungarians. The Hungarian minority in Romania constitutes the country's largest minority, or as much as 6.0 per cent of the entire population. With a population of about 19,000,000 people in 2022, Romania received 989,357 Ukrainian refugees on 27 May 2022, according to the United Nations (UN).

The 2022 Russian invasion of Ukraine that began on 24 February 2022 triggered a major refugee crisis in Europe. In connection with the Russian invasion of Ukraine on 24 February 2022, as part of the Russian-Ukrainian war, by 15 May 2022, more than 6,223,821 Ukrainian refugees left the territory of Ukraine, moving to the countries closest to the west of Ukraine, of which more than 919,574 people fled to neighboring Romania.

Population evolution 

Romania's population has declined steadily in recent decades, from a peak of 23.2 million in 2002 to 19.12 million in 2021. Among the causes of population decline are high mortality, a low fertility rate since 1990, and tremendous levels of emigration.

In 1990, Romania's population was estimated to be 23.21 million inhabitants. For the entire period 1990–2006, the estimated population loss tops 1.5 million, but it is likely to be higher, given the explosion of migration for work after 2001 and the tendency of some migrants to settle permanently in the countries where they live.

Sources give varied estimates for Romania's historical population. The National Institute for Research and Development in Informatics (NIRDI) gives the following numbers (the figure for 2020 was provided by the National Institute of Statistics - INSSE):

Ethnic groups

Slightly more than 10% of the population of Romania is formed of minorities of Romania. The principal minorities are Hungarians and Roma, although other smaller ethnic groups exist too. Before World War II, minorities represented more than 28% of the total population. During the war that percentage was halved, largely by the loss of the border areas of Bessarabia and northern Bukovina (to the former Soviet Union, now Moldova and Ukraine) and southern Dobrudja (to Bulgaria). Two-thirds of the ethnic German population either left or were deported after World War II, a period that was followed by decades of relatively regular (by communist standards) migration. During the interwar period in Romania, the total number of ethnic Germans amounted to as much as 786,000 (according to some sources and estimates dating to 1939), a figure which had subsequently fallen to circa 36,000 as of 2011 in contemporary Romania. One of the reasons for which the number of Germans in Romania fell is because after the Romanian Revolution there has been a mass migration of Transylvania Saxons to Germany, in what was referred by British daily newspaper Guardian to as 'the most astonishing, and little reported, ethnic migration in modern Europe'.

Of a total population of three quarter million Jews before World War II, about a third were killed during the Holocaust. Mass emigration, mostly to Israel and United States, has reduced the surviving Jewish community to less than 6,000 in 2002 (it is estimated that the real numbers could be 3-4 times higher).

Hungarians (Magyars; see Hungarians in Romania, especially in Harghita, Covasna, and Mureș counties) and Romani (Roma; see Romani people in Romania) are the principal minorities, with a declining German population (Banat Swabians in Timiș; Transylvanian Saxons in Sibiu, Brașov and elsewhere), and smaller numbers of Czechs, Slovaks, Serbs, Croats, and Banat Bulgarians (in Banat), Ukrainians (especially in Maramureș and Bukovina), Greeks of Romania (especially in Brăila and Constanța), Turks and Tatars (mainly in Constanța), Armenians, Russians (Lipovans, Old Believers in Tulcea), Jews and others. Since the Romanian Revolution of 1989, Bucharest and other cities have again become increasingly cosmopolitan, including identifiable presences from outside the EU (Chinese, Turks, Moldovans, Syrians, Iraqis, Africans) as well as from the EU (French, Italians, Germans, British, Greeks). In Romania, there are also guest workers from countries such as Vietnam and Nepal.

Minority populations are greatest in Transylvania and the Banat, areas in the north and west of the country, which were part of the Kingdom of Hungary (after 1867 the Austria-Hungary) until the end of World War I. Even before the union with Romania, ethnic Romanians comprised the overall majority in Transylvania. However, ethnic Hungarians and Germans were the dominant urban population until relatively recently, while Hungarians still constitute the majority in Harghita and Covasna counties.

Romani people constitute one of Romania's largest minorities. According to the 2011 Romanian census, they number 621,573 people or 3.08% of the total population, being the second-largest ethnic minority in Romania after Hungarians, with significant populations in Mureș (8.9%) and Călărași (7,47%) counties. There are different estimates about the size of the total population of people with Romani ancestry in Romania because a lot of people of Romani descent do not declare themselves Romani. The number of Romani people is usually underestimated in official statistics and may represent 5–11% of Romania's population.

After Hungarians and Romani, Ukrainians of Romania are the third-largest minority. According to the 2011 Romanian census they number 51,703 people, making up 0.3% of the total population. Ukrainians mainly live in northern Romania, in areas close to the Ukrainian border. Over 60% of all Romanian Ukrainians live in Maramureș County (where they make up 6.77% of the population).

Origins

Vital statistics

Total Fertility Rate from 1850 to 1899
The total fertility rate is the number of children born per woman. It is based on fairly good data for the entire period. Sources: Our World In Data and Gapminder Foundation.

Before WWI

Between WWI and WWII

After WWII

Main sources:

Source: National Institute of Statistics

Note: The 2011 Romanian census gave a figure of 20,121,641.

Current vital statistics 

The current vital statistics of Romania are as follows:

Life expectancy 1950–2020 

Average life expectancy at age 0 of the total population.

Birth rates by counties 
Romania has 41 counties and one city with a special status, namely Bucharest. Ilfov County has the highest crude birth rate (12.0‰), while Vâlcea County has the lowest crude birth rate (6.6‰). Birth rates are generally higher in rural areas compared to urban areas.

Demographics statistics

Demographic statistics according to the World Population Review in 2019.

One birth every 3 minutes	
One death every 2 minutes	
Net loss of one person every 5 minutes
One net migrant every 19 minutes	

The following demographic statistics are from the CIA World Factbook, unless otherwise indicated.

Population 

 19,000,000  (January 2023 est.)

Median age
total: 41.6 years. Country comparison to the world: 38th
male: 40.2 years 
female: 43 years (2018 est.)

Birth rate
8.7 births/1,000 population (2018 est.) Country comparison to the world: 211st

Death rate
12 deaths/1,000 population (2018 est.) Country comparison to the world: 17th

Total fertility rate
1.71 children born/woman (2017) Country comparison to the world: 154th

Net migration rate
-0.2 migrant(s)/1,000 population (2018 est.) Country comparison to the world: 113rd
-0.13 migrant(s)/1,000 population (2006 est.)

Mother's mean age at first birth
26.7 years (2014 est.)

Population growth rate
-0.35% (2018 est.) Country comparison to the world: 219th
-0.127% (2007 estimate).

Urban-rural ratio
Romania is one of the least urbanised countries in Europe. Just a slight majority, 56.4 percent, lives in urban areas (12,546,212 people in total). The remainder, 43.6 percent, lives in rural areas (9,695,506 people in total).

urban population: 54% of total population (2018)
rate of urbanization: -0.38% annual rate of change (2015–20 est.)

Sex ratio
at birth:1.06 male(s)/female
under 15 years:1.05 male(s)/female
15–64 years:0.99 male(s)/female
65 years and over:0.71 male(s)/female
total population:0.95 male(s)/female (2008 est.)

Infant mortality rate
9.2 deaths/1,000 live births (May 2010); down from 17.3 deaths/1,000 live births in 2002.

Life expectancy at birth
total population: 75.6 years (2018 est.) Country comparison to the world: 106th
male: 72.1 years (2018 est.)
female: 79.2 years (2018 est.)
Total population: 75 years
male: 71.4 years
female: 78.8 years (2015 est.)

Literacy
definition: age 15 and over can read and write (2015 est.)
total population: 98.8% 
male: 99.1% 
female: 98.5% (2015 est.)

School life expectancy (primary to tertiary education)
total: 14 years 
male: 14 years 
female: 15 years (2016)

Unemployment, youth ages 15–24
total: 20.6%. Country comparison to the world: 62nd
male: 19.9% 
female: 21.8% (2016 est.)

Nationality
The noun form is Romanian(s), and the adjectival form is Romanian.

Age structure

0–14 years: 14.31% (male 1,576,621 /female 1,493,082)
15–24 years: 10.45% (male 1,151,312 /female 1,091,956)
25–54 years: 46.11% (male 5,010,272 /female 4,883,090)
55–64 years: 12.37% (male 1,244,669 /female 1,409,854)
65 years and over: 16.76% (male 1,454,320 /female 2,141,940) (2018 est.)

The following demographic statistics are from National Institute of Statistic on 1 July 2016.

0–14 years: 14.7% (male 1,678,542/female 1,586,709)
15–64 years: 69.5% (male 7,744,863/female 7,687,078)
65 years and over: 15.8% (male 1,420,144/female 2,097,659) (2016 est.)

As a consequence of the pro-natalist policies of the Nicolae Ceaușescu regime (see Decree 770), Romania has a higher proportion of people born in the late 1960s and 1970s its population than any other Western country except Slovenia. The generations born in 1967 and 1968 were the largest, although fertility remained relatively high until 1990. 8.55% of the Romanian population was born in the period from 1976 to 1980, compared with 6.82% of Americans and 6.33% of Britons.

Age structure by ethnicity
Population by ethnicity based on age groups, according to the 2011 census:

Immigration

Foreign-born population (according to Eurostat):

Religion

 Romanian Orthodox — 86.7%
 Roman Catholic — 4.7%
 Protestant Churches (Calvin, Lutheran, Unitarian, Pentecostal, Baptist, Adventist) — 5.3%
 Greek Catholic - Uniate — 0.9%
 Islam — 0.3%
 Atheist — ≈0.04% (9,271 people)
 No religion — 0.1%
 Other religions — 2.0%
 Refused to declare — 0.1%

Religious affiliation tends to follow ethnic lines, with most ethnic Romanians identifying with the Romanian Orthodox Church. The Greek Catholic or Uniate church, reunified with the Orthodox Church by fiat in 1948, was restored after the 1989 revolution. The 2002 census indicates that 0.9% of the population is Greek Catholic, as opposed to about 10% prior to 1948. Roman Catholics, largely ethnic Hungarians and Germans, constitute 4.7% of the population; Calvinists, Baptists (see Baptist Union of Romania and Convention of the Hungarian Baptist Churches of Romania), Pentecostals, and Lutherans make up another 5%. There are smaller numbers of Unitarians, Muslims, and other religions.

See also
 Ageing of Europe
 Population exchange between Bulgaria and Romania
 Immigration to Romania

Notes

References

External links

 United Nations Statistics - Romania
 Romanian National Statistic Institute (site is in Romanian language, PDF files are in Romanian and English)
 Population density map